Frans Hubertus Henricus Weekers (born 17 October 1967) is a Dutch politician of the People's Party for Freedom and Democracy (VVD) and lawyer.

Early life and education 
Weekers was born in Weert, in the province Limburg. His father was an accountant and member of the municipal council. His paternal grandfather was a wethouder in Weert. His mother was a schoolteacher.

Weekers attended secondary school in Weert between 1980 and 1987, where he did the vwo programme. He became a member of the VVD in 1986, while he was still in secondary school. Weekers subsequently went to the Vrije Universiteit Amsterdam 1987, where he obtained an MSc degree in economics and econometrics in 1992 and an LLM degree in 1993.

Career

Legal work
Weekers worked as a legal advisor for the assurance company Van Rey and as the assistant of the member of the House of Representatives Jos van Rey in 1993 and 1994.

Politics
Weekers was an elected member of the municipal council of Weert from 1994 to 2003, where he was the fraction leader of the VVD. From 1994, he also worked as a lawyer in Weert, until he was elected to the House of Representatives in 1998. He served as a member of the House of Representatives from 19 May 1998 to 23 May 2002, a second time from 3 June 2003 until 14 October 2010 and a third time from 20 September until 5 November 2012.

Weekers was State Secretary at the Ministry of Finance in the First Rutte cabinet starting 14 October 2010. On 5 November 2012, he was re-appointed in the Second Rutte cabinet, dealing with fiscal affairs and finances of lower governments. He resigned on 4 February 2014 and was replaced by Eric Wiebes, an alderman of Amsterdam.

Resignation 
Opposition parties have fiercely criticized his performance. According to them, Weekers had insufficient knowledge of the tax office being behind on payments, such as providing rental and care allowances to about 100,000 citizens. After Weekers heard that a motion of no confidence was imminent, he submitted his resignation on 29 January 2014.

References

External links

Official
  Mr.Drs. F.H.H. (Frans) Weekers Parlement & Politiek

1967 births
Living people
Dutch fiscal jurists
Dutch prosecutors
Dutch political consultants
Mayors in Limburg (Netherlands)
People from Beek
Mayors of Heerlen
Members of the House of Representatives (Netherlands)
Municipal councillors in Limburg (Netherlands)
People from Weert
People's Party for Freedom and Democracy politicians
State Secretaries for Finance of the Netherlands
Vrije Universiteit Amsterdam alumni
20th-century Dutch lawyers
20th-century Dutch politicians
21st-century Dutch lawyers
21st-century Dutch politicians